The Gorgas machine gun (or sometimes just a Gorgas gun) was a manually cranked prototype machine gun, the creation of Confederate States General Josiah Gorgas.

It had a single  smooth-bore barrel. The barrel was fed from a revolver-like ring, but with an axis of rotation perpendicular to the bore, rather than the usual revolver configuration with parallel axes. The cylinder housed 18 copper-lined chambers that were muzzle loaded from the outer side of the ring. The interior side of the multiple-chamber ring was lined with the corresponding 18 percussion cap nipples. The ring was rotated by a hand lever. The gun had a cast iron receiver.

The sole exemplar built was not used in combat, not having been sufficiently perfected.

See also 
Agar gun
Centrifugal gun
Confederate Revolving Cannon
Gatling gun
Puckle gun
Revolver cannon

References 
  Online version:  

Early machine guns
Weapons of the Confederate States of America
American Civil War weapons